Bergen (born Belgin Sarılmışer; 15 July 1958 – 14 August 1989) was a Turkish singer. She broke the sales record with her album, Acıların Kadını. Bergen has become one of the symbols and faces of violence against women in Turkey with her life and death. Her personal life was influential in her gloomy sound and led to her success. Her husband, Halis Serbest, threw nitric acid on her face resulting in blindness in her right eye. After that, she continued singing and chose to cover the blind eye with her long hair. She was murdered by Serbest, whom she had divorced after releasing several successful albums.

Life and career

Early life and career beginnings
Belgin Sarılmışer was born on 15 July 1958 in Mersin as the last child of a family of seven children. After her parents got divorced, she moved to Ankara with her mother.

Bergen, who completed her primary education at Yenimahalle Yunus Emre Primary School, was singing and playing the mandolin at school. Noticing Bergen's talent for music, the teachers encouraged her to study at the conservatory after graduation. The artist, who took the exams of the Ankara State Conservatory and won the piano department with the first place, studied piano and cello for the first two years. She left school unfinished due to financial difficulties and worked as a civil servant in the PTT for a while, raising her age with a court decision.

The claim that she got married in 1977 and had a child was denied by her family.

In 1977, she took the stage at Feyman Night Club, where she went to have fun with her friends. When she was liked by the club owner, İlhan Feyman, she received an offer to work there. She accepted the offer and took the stage with the Grup Locomotive orchestra at Feyman Night Club with a repertoire of Turkish classical music and Turkish pop. When she finished his job at Feyman Night Club after a year of work, she accepted a car offer from Kuyubaşı Club in Adana in exchange for 8 months of singing work. But at the end of the job, the car was taken from her and she was in debt.

Bergen, who went to Adana for business in 1981 after Ankara, met Halis Serbest in Adana. He sent flowers to the singer every night and went to the club where Bergen worked every night and watched the singer from the front table. They married with the insistence and stubbornness of him. However, Serbest was married to someone else and has three children. Bergen ended the relationship when it turned out that her marriage, which she thought existed, was a lie arranged by Serbest.

Bergen, who returned to Ankara from Adana due to the violence by Serbest many times, took the stage again in nightclubs. She changed her name to 'Bergen', inspired by the Norwegian city of Bergen. In 1979, she started performing as an artist in Ankara Başkent Casino with Bülent Ersoy, İbrahim Tatlıses and Müjde Ar. In 1982, she released the album Şikayetim Var. Bergen, who said that she fell in love despite the violence that Serbest inflicted on her, married Serbest again on January 9, 1982, and was officially married to Serbest. In the same year, on October 31, while working in İzmir, she was attacked by nitric acid by her husband's paid attacker. The artist lost one eye in the attack, and most of her body was burned. Bergen said the following about the incident:"Towards the end of our relationship, I found a woman's panties at home. That's when I was completely devastated and fled from Adana to Ankara. As soon as he found out that I had escaped, he followed me. Finally, he found me in a hostel in Izmir. He was threatening me because I didn't give heed. He would say "I will throw acid on your face". But I didn't believe it.

Nitric acid attack

Halis Serbes gave 500 thousand liras to a hired killer and sent him to İzmir. On the night of October 31, 1982, at the gate of the New York pavilion in İzmir Alsancak, Bergen was about to get into a taxi with her mother, when the hired attacker threw a bucket of nitric acid on the singer. Bergen would describe the event as follows in a later interview::"In that moment, I lost sight in both my eyes. I was hardly aware of anything as I was a little drunk. I could only hear screams. "Get her to the water fountain" they said at one point. But the water was cut off. The water flowed like a thin pencil. They tore my clothes and wrapped me with clean ones. At that moment, everything was dark, I couldn't see anything, I couldn't even open my eyes. A short time later, a police car arrived. They took me to Ege University Hospital. I stayed in the hospital for 45 days, because of my wounds."
Her mother, who was with her at the time of the incident, said: "Two years ago, he abducted my daughter. I told Bergen many times that she should not marry this man who is a punk, that he could not make her happy. But she said, "Once my name is on people's lips with him, I can't go back." She didn't listen. My daughter, who sang Turkish music in nightclubs, became a sought-after artist in a short time with her voice. My son-in-law, who was jealous of Bergen's success, was creating a disturbance and fighting every day. Finally, thinking that this marriage would not work anymore, she decided to divorce. Despite this, he did not give up on my daughter. He was constantly threatening her, saying, "I won't leave you to anyone else."

Bergen was seriously injured in this incident. Onur Erol, the famous plastic surgeon of the period, who followed the event from the press, voluntarily helped Bergen.

Halis Serbes was caught and sentenced to 13 years in prison after 2 months of desertion. Serbes, who called the hospital after the attack, cried and lied, saying that he had nothing to do with the incident.

Comeback and albums
After the treatment, with the persuasion of composer Cengiz Özşeker, the artist returned to the stage and met with the audience in the club Özşeker owned until 1985. In 1983, the artist entered the studio with Özşeker in İzmir and prepared the album Kardeşiz Kader, consisting of 12 songs, with a limited budget. Invited to Istanbul by Yaşar Kekeva, owner of Yaşar Records, the artist met with music lovers in Istanbul for the first time on 29 March 1985. The singer prepared the long play album İnsan Severse in 1985 under the musical direction of Burhan Bayar, and gained great fame with the album Acıların Kadını in late 1986. Woman of Sorrow has sold over 1 million copies. Upon the interest of the album, the artist was given the Golden Record and Golden Cassette awards in 1987 with the title of "The Best Selling Arabesque Female Artist of the Year 1986". Bergen made her acting debut in 1987 with the movie "Woman of Pain", written and directed by Ülkü Erakalın. The singer was stabbed by a photographer of the club where she went for a concert in Adana. She survived the attack with minor injuries and recovered soon after receiving outpatient treatment. The artist, who left the stage for a while, released the albums "Burn him too God", Sevgimin Bedeli and İstemiyorum under the musical direction of Selami Şahin, Özer Şenay and Cengiz Tekin. Bergen, who made peace with Serbes, who was released from prison in 1988, left her music and cinema life behind and then divorced him April 1989. Returning to the stage in June of the same year, the artist presented his last album Yıllar Affetmez before her death in 1989.

During the prison period, she sent money to Serbes and exchanged letters. Regarding her reconciliation with Serbes after he was released from prison, her cousin said:"She was afraid because his men were after her. How many times she tried to leave, he raided my house. Bergen was hiding in my house. He raided my house with the men we call the mafia in Mersin. He said, 'If you make a wrong move, I will shoot the gun, tell me where she is.' Bergen was hiding under the bed in my house. "

In an interview shortly before the attacker was released from prison, Bergen said:"I have little feelings. It hurts to imagine the prison and him. Sometimes I hate him. The years that were hard for me... I am undecided yet.

Death and legacy
In the city she went to for the promotion of her latest album Yıllar Affetmez, she was shot and killed at the age of 30 by Serbest in Adana. She was buried in her hometown, Mersin. Her mother was also injured in the attack. The cemetery in Tarsus, Mersin is open to visitors.

Serbest, who fled abroad after the murder, was caught in Germany. he was sentenced to 15 years, reduced for good behavior to 3 years. Considering his 16-month detention period in Germany and Turkey, he was sentenced to 7 months in prison.

Her mother said about the attack day:"Bergen had a concert in Kayseri, Halis came in front of the hotel where we stay and threatened, 'If you don't come back to me, I will kill you all'. Since we heard these threats so often, we didn't pay much attention... My daughter turned her back to the flowers in the back and said, 'It's all over now, I won't go back to you!' Hearing this word, he took out a pistol from his waistband. I shouted as loud as I could and asked for help. This time he aimed the gun at me to silence me and fired. They left us in blood and got in the car with his half-brother and ran away."

Regarding his short sentence, the murderer said: "After committing the Bergen murder, I spent less time in prison; I stayed in prison for 7 months. Now, in underdeveloped countries, no matter what country it is, it's over if you're strong," he said, and claimed that his main target was the artist's mother.

Her sister talked about her mother's situation after the incident: "After that pain, my mother buried herself in the grave. Then she always wore black; both at the wedding and at the feast... With Belgin's death, my mother died too. My mother was talking to herself. Belgin loved coffee very much. After my sister passed away, my mother made two Turkish coffees every morning, talked to Belgin and drank her coffee. She used to pray until the evening in my sister's room covered with her posters. She used to say, "My daughter is afraid of loneliness and the dark". We used to sit in the cemetery with my mother until the morning."

The artist's grave is protected by a 6-lock cage due to the murderer's threats. Her sister said the following about this situation: "32 years ago, that man, before he killed Belgin, used to call at 2 in the morning and say, "I will not leave her bones to you all, I will kill her." My mother had that cage built because of that."

In 2018, Serbest was arrested on charges of sexual abuse of 4 children.

In 2022, a biopic film was made about Bergen, with actress Farah Zeynep Abdullah portraying her.

Albums

References

1959 births
1989 deaths
20th-century Turkish women singers
Deaths by firearm in Turkey
Blind singers
Deaths by firearm